The Texas Meritorious Service Award is a Texas military award that may be presented to civilians, organizations, or non-Texas service members for exceptional service and support to the Texas Military Forces.

Eligibility 
The Texas Meritorious Service Award may be presented to civilians, organizations, or non-Texas service members for "exceptional service and support to the Texas Military Forces over substantial periods of time".  It may also be awarded for "outstanding service and support on special projects and operations". Service members of the Texas Military Forces are ineligible, however it may be awarded to an organization with which a service member is associated.

Authority 
The Texas Meritorious Service Award was authorized and approved by Adjutant General Lieutenant General Ross Ayers on 23 April 1970.

Description 
The Texas Meritorious Service Award is a black, plastic plaque in the form of a shield, measuring 8-1/2 inches in height and 7 inches in width. It is mounted evenly on a shield-shaped wood background of beveled, stained, and varnished pecan or oak, 1/2 of inch thick and 1-1/8 inches larger than the plastic shield. The plastic shield has a raised gold border, a raised gold (3 inches in circumscribing diameter) reproduction of the seal of the State of Texas, centered in the upper half of the shield, and five lines of raised gold 1/4 of an inch upper and lower case block letters which read, "Texas Meritorious Service Award in Recognition of Outstanding Service and Support of the State Military Forces." Beneath the last line of lettering is a depressed box, 1-3/4 inches in length and 1/2 of an inch in height for insertion of an individualized brass plate.

See also 

 Awards and decorations of the Texas Military
 Awards and decorations of the Texas government
 Texas Military Forces
 Texas Military Department
 List of conflicts involving the Texas Military

References 

Awards and decorations of the Texas Military Forces
Texas Military Forces
Texas Military Department